The 2020 Los Angeles Valiant season was the third season of Los Angeles Valiant's existence in the Overwatch League and their first full season under head coach Mike "Packing10" Szklanny. The Valiant planned host two homestand events in the 2020 season at The Novo, but all homestand matches were canceled due to the COVID-19 pandemic.

On August 22, the Valiant clinched a spot in the season playoffs with a win over the Vancouver Titans. In the first round of the North America bracket, Los Angeles defeated the Florida Mayhem by a score of 3–2. The following day, the Valiant were swept by the Philadelphia Fusion in the second round of the upper bracket, sending them to the lower bracket. A 1–3 loss to the Washington Justice in the subsequent round eliminated the Valiant from the playoffs.

Preceding offseason

Organizational changes 
After releasing head coach Moon Byung-chul the previous season, assistant coach Mike "Packing10" Szklanny was named the team's interim head coach for the remainder of the season. Packing10 was officially named the team's full-time head coach in early September 2019. The following month, the Valiant added former Boston Uprising assistant coach Jordan "Gunba" Graham as an assistant coach. Gunba was an assistant coach for the Valiant in 2018.

Roster changes 
The Valiant enter the new season with no free agents, three players which they have the option to retain for another year, and five players under contract. The OWL's deadline to exercise a team option is November 11, after which any players not retained will become a free agent. Free agency officially began on October 7.

Acquisitions 
The Valiant's first acquisitions of the offseason were announced on October 31, with the signings of main tank Song "Dreamer" Sang-lok from the Sydney Drop Bears, flex DPS Damon "Apply" Conti, support Owen "Slur" Warner from Samsung Morning Stars, and support Mun "Lastro" Jung-won from Skyfoxes. On January 7, the Valiant revealed two more additions in main tank Rick "GiG" Salazar and support Park "RaiN" Jae-ho in a skit video for the team's new color scheme. A week later, on January 16, the team announced the signing of damage player Kai "KSP" Collins.

Departures 
The Valiant made their first offseason moves on October 23, releasing DPS Brady "Agilities" Girardi, trading off-tank Indy "SPACE" Halpern to the Los Angeles Gladiators, and trading flex support Park "KariV" Young-seo to the Toronto Defiant. In mid-November, Los Angeles announced that they had parted ways with main tank Russell "FCTFCTN" Campbell. On December 12, support player Scott "Custa" Kennedy announced that he was retiring from professional Overwatch play to join the Overwatch League as an analyst. Prior to the start of the season, Owen "Slur" Warner silently departed with the team after it was revealed that he had previously used a racial slur. He later changed his name to Provide to distance himself from his past.

Roster

Standings

Game log

Regular season

Midseason tournaments 

| style="text-align:center;" | Bonus wins awarded: 1

Postseason

References 

Los Angeles Valiant
Los Angeles Valiant
Los Angeles Valiant seasons